Iizume Dam is an earthfill dam located in Aomori Prefecture in Japan. The dam is used for flood control and water supply. The catchment area of the dam is 11.7 km2. The dam impounds about 24  ha of land when full and can store 2380 thousand cubic meters of water. The construction of the dam was started on 1967 and completed in 1973.

References

Dams in Aomori Prefecture
1973 establishments in Japan